Kummariguda,  is a village, in Kothur mandal of Ranga Reddy district in the state of Telangana in India.

See also 
 Shadnagar
 Kothur
 Swadhyay Parivar
 Pandurang Shastri Athavale

Villages in Ranga Reddy district